HMS Termagant was an 18-gun sloop of the Royal Navy. She was launched in 1796 and sold in 1819.

Career

On 28 December 1797 Termagant was four leagues off Spurn Head when she sighted and gave chase to a French privateer. After four hours Termagant succeeded in capturing the schooner Victoire, of 14 guns and 74 men. She had been out ten days during which time she had captured two colliers; she had been in pursuit of a British merchantman when Termagant first sighted her.

On 1 September 1800, Termagant, Captain Skipsey, captured the French Navy polacca Capricieuse some 30 leagues west of Corsica after a two-hour chase. Capricieuse was armed with six guns and had a crew of 68 men under the command of enseigne de vaisseau Gandserrand. She was three days out of Toulon and was sailing to Egypt with 350 stands of arms, shot, a French general, and a Chef de Bataillon. She was also carrying dispatches, which however she was able to destroy before the British boarded her.
Three days later and some 10 leagues away, Termagant captured the privateer General Holtz, of two guns and 26 men. Skipsey scuttled and sank the privateer.

Guerrier was sailing from Toulon to Alexandria, Egypt, with a cargo of arms and ammunition.

Because Termagant served in the navy's Egyptian campaign (8 March to 2 September 1801), her officers and crew qualified for the clasp "Egypt" to the Naval General Service Medal that the Admiralty authorized in 1850 to all surviving claimants.

Termagant destroyed the castle at Nerja on 20 May. The British squadron then supported a guerrilla offensive against Almuñécar. On 24 May with Hyacinth and Basilisk, Termagant took a French privateer of two guns and 30 or 40 men under the castle. The British squadron bombarded the castle, breaching the walls. The French then retreated to Grenada. Termagants only casualty was one man wounded. Prize money for the "capture of a brass gun and the destruction of a French privateer, name unknown" was payable in March 1836.

Fate
On 3 February 1819 the "Principal Officers and Commissioners of His Majesty's Navy" offered "Termagant, of 28 guns and 427 tons", "lying at Chatham" for sale. Termagant was sold on 3 February 1819 to James Graham, of Harwich, for £1,460. 1819.

Notes

Citations

References

 Fonds Marine. Campagnes (opérations; divisions et stations navales; missions diverses). Inventaire de la sous-série Marine BB4. Tome premier : BB4 1 à 209 (1790-1804) 
 
 

1796 ships
Ships built in Deptford
Sloops of the Royal Navy
Sixth rates of the Royal Navy